Nick or Nicholas Russell may refer to:
 Nick Russell (basketball) (born 1991), American basketball player
 Nicholas Russell, 6th Earl Russell (1968–2014)
 Nick Russell (actor), Australian television actor, producer and director 
 Nicky Russell, lead singer for L.I.G.A.
 Nick Russell (Power Rangers)

See also
Nicholas Russel or Nikolai Sudzilovsky (1850–1930), revolutionary and scientist